Dmitri Ivanovich Vasilyev (21 October 1900 – 5 January 1984) was a Soviet and Russian film director. He was a laureate of two Stalin Prizes in 1947 and 1951.

Filmography
 The Last Night (1936); co-directed with Yuli Raizman
 Lenin in October (1937); co-directed with Mikhail Romm
 Alexander Nevsky (1938); co-directed with Sergei Eisenstein
 In the Name of the Fatherland (1943); co-directed with Vsevolod Pudovkin
Admiral Nakhimov (1946); co-directed with Vsevolod Pudovkin
 Zhukovsky (1950); co-directed with Vsevolod Pudovkin
 Youth Sports Festival (1951)
 Over Tissa (1958)
 Attack and Retreat (1964); co-directed with Giuseppe De Santis

External links

1900 births
1984 deaths
Stalin Prize winners
Recipients of the Order of the Red Banner of Labour
Russian film directors
Soviet film directors